Jotunheim Valley is a high, mainly ice-free valley to the east of Wolak Peak and Utgard Peak in the Asgard Range of Victoria Land, Antarctica. Saint Pauls Mountain stands at the head of the valley. The feature was named in 1982 by the New Zealand Antarctic Place-Names Committee from a proposal by G.G.C. Claridge, a soil scientist with the DSIR, New Zealand. It is one of several names in the Asgard Range from Norse mythology, Jotunheim being the home of the giants.

References

Valleys of Victoria Land
McMurdo Dry Valleys